WCKL (560 AM) was a radio station licensed to Catskill, New York, United States, to broadcast at 560 kHz. The station lost its license in October 2016 in a consent decree with the FCC in which Brian Dodge admitted lying to the FCC, using various false names and addresses to control radio stations, numerous other violations, and a $100,000 fine to be paid by selling three FM translators to other broadcasters. Earlier, the station had sold to Clear Channel Communications (now iHeartMedia) in a $4.3 million package deal which included WCKL, WCTW, WHUC and then-WTHK (now WZCR).

WCKL had been primarily dark under its final ownership, primarily due to non payment of transmitter site rent to iHeartMedia. It had been silent since March 10, 2015, but were granted on March 9, 2016, STA (Special Temporary Authority) to use a temporary site at 25% power from a long wire antenna. The station never used that facility according to the consent decree so as a matter of FCC law WCKL's license expired March 10, 2016, due to one year of continuous silence.

References

External links
FCC Station Search Details: DWCKL (Facility ID: 63526)
FCC History Cards (covering 1966-1980)

Radio stations established in 1970
CKL
1970 establishments in New York (state)
Defunct radio stations in the United States
Radio stations disestablished in 2016
2016 disestablishments in New York (state)
Catskill, New York
CKL